Beat Wirz (born 30 January 1953) is a Swiss former rower. He competed in the men's coxed pair event at the 1968 Summer Olympics.

References

External links
 

1953 births
Living people
Swiss male rowers
Olympic rowers of Switzerland
Rowers at the 1968 Summer Olympics
People from Willisau District
Sportspeople from the canton of Lucerne